The Városi Sportcsarnok is a multi-use indoor stadium in Békéscsaba, Hungary. The arena, which has an oval shape, very similar to the Colosseum, was opened in 1988, and has been modernized and renovated for the 2004 European Women's Handball Championship, to fulfil the strict criterium of the European Handball Federation.

It is the home ground of the local sports clubs, from which the best known is Békéscsabai Előre NKSE, that usually play in a sold-out arena. The sports hall also hosts martial art events, futsal matches, galas, expos, balls, dance competitions and motocross races. In the building of the arena runs the Sport Hotel, which offers rooms in all comfort levels with additional services such as gym, massage, sauna and solarium.

Two internationally recognized gastronomic events, the Beer Festival and Knuckle Parade and the Sausage Festival also takes place in the Városi Sportcsarnok and in the surrounding area in every year.

References

External links
 Beer Festival and Knuckle Parade Official Website
 Sausage Festival Official Website

Indoor arenas in Hungary
Handball venues in Hungary
Buildings and structures in Békés County